Social Studies is an American television sitcom that aired on UPN from March 18 to April 22, 1997.

Premise
An administrator at a Manhattan boarding school finds herself at odds with a young, open-minded history teacher over how the students should be educated and disciplined.

Cast
Julia Duffy as Frances Harmon
Bonnie McFarlane as Katherine "Kit" Weaver
Adam Ferrara as Dan Rossini
Vanessa Evigan as Sara Valentine
Lisa Wilhoit as Madison Lewis
Corbin Allred as Chip Wigley
Monica McSwain as Carla Stone
Rashaan Nall as Jared Moore
Jordan Brower as Matt
Jarrett Lennon as Edgar
Chris McKibbin as Bryan Bowser
Chris Owen as Collin McGuirk

Episodes

References

External links
 
TV Guide
epguides.com

1997 American television series debuts
1997 American television series endings
English-language television shows
UPN original programming
Television shows set in New York City
Television series by ABC Studios
Television series about teenagers
1990s American teen sitcoms
1990s American school television series